The women's triple jump at the 2017 Asian Athletics Championships was held on 8 July.

Results

References
Results

Long
Triple jump at the Asian Athletics Championships